Cider is an alcoholic beverage made from the fermented juice of apples. Cider is widely available in the United Kingdom (particularly in the West Country) and the Republic of Ireland. The UK has the world's highest per capita consumption, as well as the largest cider-producing companies. Ciders from the South West of England are generally higher in alcoholic content. Cider is also popular in many Commonwealth countries, such as India, Canada, Australia, and New Zealand. As well as the UK and its former colonies, cider is popular in Portugal (mainly in Minho and Madeira), France (particularly Normandy and Brittany), Friuli, and northern Spain (specifically  Asturias). Germany also has its own types of cider with Rhineland-Palatinate and Hesse producing a particularly tart version known as Apfelwein. In the U.S., varieties of fermented cider are often called hard cider to distinguish alcoholic cider from non-alcoholic apple cider or "sweet cider", also made from apples. In Canada, cider cannot contain less than 2.5% or over 13% absolute alcohol by volume.

The juice of most varieties of apple, including crab apples, can be used to make cider, but cider apples are best. The addition of sugar or extra fruit before a second fermentation increases the ethanol content of the resulting beverage. Cider alcohol content varies from 1.2% to 8.5% ABV or more in traditional English ciders, and 3.5% to 12% in continental ciders. In UK law, it must contain at least 35% apple juice (fresh or from concentrate), although CAMRA (the Campaign for Real Ale) says that "real cider" must be at least 90% fresh apple juice. In the US, there is a 50% minimum. In France, cider must be made solely from apples.

In 2014, a study found that a  bottle of mass-market cider contained five teaspoons (20.5 g) of sugar, nearly the amount the WHO recommends as an adult's daily allowance of added sugar, and 5–10 times the amount of sugar in lager or ale.

Perry is a similar product to cider made from fermented pear juice. When distilled, cider turns into fruit brandy.

Appearance and types 

The flavour of cider varies. Ciders can be classified from dry to sweet. Their appearance ranges from cloudy with sediment to completely clear, and their colour ranges from almost colourless to amber to brown. The variations in clarity and colour are mostly due to filtering between pressing and fermentation. Some apple varieties will produce a clear cider without any need for filtration. Both sparkling and still ciders are made; the sparkling variety is the more common.

Modern, mass-produced ciders closely resemble sparkling wine in appearance. More traditional brands tend to be darker and cloudier. They are often stronger than the mass-produced varieties and taste more strongly of apples. Almost colourless, white cider has the same apple juice content as conventional cider but is harder to create because the cider maker has to blend various apples to create a clearer liquid. White ciders tend to be sweeter and more refreshing. They are typically 7–8 % ABV in strength. Black cider, by contrast, is dry amber premium cider which has an alcohol content of 7–8 % ABV.

Etymology 
The word cider is first mentioned in Middle English in biblical use as sicer / ciser "strong drink", "strong liquor" in the 13th century and as sither(e) / cidre "liquor made from the juice of fruits" → "beverage made from apples" in the 14th century. It was probably first borrowed from Old French primitive form sizre "fermented beverage" (Eadwine Psalter, LXVIII, 14) and then from another younger French form cistre, later sidre, cidre "beverage made from fruits". 

The specific meaning "fermented beverage from apples" appears in Old French for the first time by the Norman chronicler Wace in 1130 / 1140 (Wace, conception de Nostre Dame). The Old French word * is from Gallo-Romance * found in Medieval Latin by the English author Alexander Neckam (Neckam, De nominibus utensilium). It is an altered form of Church Latin  "fermented drink", itself borrowed from Greek , ultimately from Hebrew , "intoxicating liquor". 

The cognates in the different Romance languages : Spanish, Portuguese , Italian , etc., in the Germanic languages : German Zider, etc. are all from French and Breton , Welsh  (through an English form) probably too.

By the 19th century, cider referred to the expressed juice of apples, either before fermentation as sweet cider, or after fermentation, a hard cider.

Cider styles

Geography and origins

Cider is an ancient beverage. The first recorded reference to cider dates back to Julius Caesar’s first attempt to invade Britain in 55 BCE where he found the native Celts fermenting crabapples. He would take the discovery back through continental Europe with his retreating troops. In the cider market, ciders can be broken down into two main styles, standard and specialty. The first group consists of modern ciders and heritage ciders. Modern ciders are produced from culinary apples such as Gala. Heritage ciders are produced from heritage, cider specific, crab or wild apples, like Golden Russet. Historically, cider was made from the only resources available to make it, so style was not a large factor when considering the production process. Apples were historically confined to the cooler climates of Western Europe and Britain where civilisation was slow to develop record keeping. Cider was first made from crab apples, ancestors of the bittersweet and bittersharp apples used by today's English cider makers.

English cider contained a drier, higher-alcohol-content version, using open fermentation vats and bittersweet crab apples. The French developed a sweet, low-alcohol "cidre" taking advantage of the sweeter apples and the keeving process. Cider styles evolved based on the methods used, the apples available and local tastes. Production techniques developed, as with most technology, by trial and error. In fact, the variables were nearly too widespread to track, including: spontaneous fermentation, the type of vessels used, environmental conditions, and the apple varieties. Refinements came much later when cider became a commercial product and the process was better understood. However, since there is growing popularity in ciders, the production of specialty styles has begun to increase.

Modern ciders

Modern ciders are made from culinary apples and are lower in tannins and higher in acidity than other cider styles. Common culinary apples used in modern ciders include McIntosh, Golden Delicious, Jonagold, Granny Smith, Gala, and Fuji. A sweet or low alcohol cider may tend to have a strong aromatic and flavour character of apple, while drier and higher alcohol ciders will tend to produce a wider range of fruity aromas and flavours. Modern ciders vary in color from pale to yellow and can range from brilliant to a hazy clarity. Clarity can be altered through various cider making practices, depending on the cider maker's intentions.

Heritage ciders

Heritage ciders are made from both culinary and cider apples, including bittersweet, bittersharp, heirlooms, wild apples, and crabapples. Common apples used in heritage cider production include Dabinett, Kingston Black, Roxbury Russet, and Wickson. Heritage ciders are higher in tannins than modern ciders. They range in colour from yellow to amber ranging from brilliant to hazy. Clarity of heritage ciders also depends on the cider making practices used and will differ by cider maker as well.

In Canada, some cideries market "Loyalist-style" ciders, which are notably dry and made with McIntosh apples, a Canadian heritage varietal.

Specialty style ciders

Specialty style ciders are open to a lot more manipulation than modern or heritage style ciders. There is no restriction to apple varieties used and the list of specialty styles continues to expand. Listed on the USACM Cider Style Guide, specialty styles include: fruit, hopped, spiced, wood-aged, sour, and iced ciders. Fruit ciders have other fruit or juices added before or after fermentation, such as cherries, blueberries and cranberries. Hopped cider is fermented with added hops, common hop varieties being Cascade, Citra, Galaxy, and Mosaic. Spiced ciders have various spices added to the cider before, during, or after fermentation. Spices like cinnamon and ginger are popular to use in production. Wood-aged ciders are ciders that are either fermented or aged in various types of wood barrels, to aid in extraction of woody, earthy flavours. Sour ciders are high acid ciders that are produced with non-standard, non-Saccharomyces yeast and bacteria, which enhance acetic and lactic acid production, in order to reach a sour profile. Ice ciders can be made by using pre-pressed frozen juice or frozen whole apples. Whole apples either come frozen from the orchard, dependent on harvest date, or are stored in a freezer prior to pressing. When the pre-pressed juice or whole apples freeze, sugars are concentrated and mostly separated from the water. Whole apples are then pressed in order to extract the concentrated juice. For the pre-pressed juice the concentrated solution is drawn off while thawing occurs. Although, according to the Alcohol and Tobacco Tax and Trade Bureau (TTB) cider producers can only label a product 'Ice Cider' if it is produced from apples naturally frozen outdoors.

Two styles not mentioned in the USACM Cider Style Guide are Rosé and Sparkling Cider. Rosé cider can be produced from apple varieties that have reddish-pink pulp, like Pink Pearl and Amour Rouge. Rosé ciders can also be created through the addition of food-grade red dyes, previously used red grape skins, like Marquette with high anthocyanin concentration, red fruits, rose petals, or hibiscus. Lastly, sparkling ciders can be produced through methods of direct carbonation, addition of carbon dioxide (CO2) or by Méthode Champenoise to re-create the traditional Champagne style.

Specific cider styles

Production

Scratting and pressing 

Apples grown for consumption are suitable for cider making, though some regional cider-makers prefer to use a mix of eating and cider apples (as in Kent, England), or exclusively cider apples (as in the West Country, England) and West of England. There are many hundreds of varieties of cultivars developed specifically for cider making.

Once the apples are gathered from trees in orchards they are scratted (ground down) into a pulp. Historically this was done using pressing stones with circular troughs, or by a cider mill. Cider mills were traditionally driven by the hand, water-mill, or horse-power. In modern times, they are likely to be powered by electricity. The pulp is then transferred to a cider press where the juice is extracted.

Traditionally, the method for squeezing the juice from the apple pulp involves placing sweet straw or haircloths between stacked layers of apple pulp. Today, apples can be quickly pressed on a mechanized belt press. The juice, after being strained in a coarse hair-sieve, is then put into either open vats or closed casks. The remaining solids (pomace) are given to farm animals as winter feed, composted, discarded or used to make liqueurs.

Fermentation 

Fermentation of ciders occurs by a very similar mechanism to the fermentation of wine. The process of alcoholic fermentation is characterised by the conversion of simple sugars into ethanol by yeasts, especially Saccharomyces cerevisiae. This is because, as "Crabtree positive" yeasts, they produce ethanol even during aerobic fermentation; in contrast, Crabtree-negative yeasts produce only biomass and carbon dioxide. This adaptation allows them a competitive edge in the fermentation of ciders due to their high alcohol tolerance, and because of this tolerance, it is common for ciders to be fermented to dryness, although that is not always the case. Fermentations will carry on until the fermentation is stopped or the yeasts run out of nutrients and can no longer metabolise, resulting in a "stuck" fermentation.

Steps taken before fermentation might include fruit or juice blending, titratable acidity and pH measurements and sometimes adjustments, and sulfur dioxide and yeast additions. This temperature would be low for most kinds of fermentation, but is beneficial for cider, as it leads to slower fermentation with less loss of delicate aromas. Fermentation can occur due to natural yeasts that are present in the must; alternately, some cider makers add cultivated strains of cider yeast, such as Saccharomyces bayanus.

During the initial stages of fermentation, there are elevated levels of carbon dioxide as the yeasts multiply and begin to break down the sugar into ethanol. In addition to fermentative metabolism of yeast, certain organoleptic compounds are formed that have an effect on the quality of cider, such as other alcohols, esters and other volatile compounds. After fermentation, racking occurs into a clean vessel, trying to leave behind as much yeast as possible. Shortly before the fermentation consumes all the sugar, the liquor is "racked" (siphoned) into new vats. This leaves dead yeast cells and other undesirable material at the bottom of the old vat. At this point, it becomes important to exclude airborne acetic bacteria, so vats are filled completely to exclude air. The fermenting of the remaining available sugar generates a small amount of carbon dioxide that forms a protective layer, reducing air contact. This final fermentation creates a small amount of carbonation. Extra sugar may be added specifically for this purpose. Racking is sometimes repeated if the liquor remains too cloudy.

Apple-based juice may also be combined with fruit to make a fine cider; fruit purées or flavourings can be added, such as grape, cherry, raspberry, or cranberry.

The cider is ready to drink after a three-month fermentation period, although it is more often matured in the vats for up to three years.

Blending and bottling 

For larger-scale cider production, ciders from vats produced from different varieties of apple may be blended to accord with market taste. If the cider is to be bottled, usually some extra sugar is added for sparkle. Higher quality ciders can be made using the champagne method, but this is expensive in time and money and requires special corks, bottles, and other equipment. Some home brewers use beer bottles, which work perfectly well, and are inexpensive. This allows the cider to become naturally carbonated.

Chemistry

Flavour compounds 
Tannins are crucial flavour compounds in cider. Since perfecting the tannin content in the cider is needed for optimal success, the tannins or "polyphenols of apples are largely implicated in cider quality." They are important because they control the astringency and bitterness of the cider. Tannins are necessary components to focus on when producing cider because the length of the aftertaste of the cider (astringency) and bitterness are both strong chemicals that affect people's opinion on the cider. Tannins are polyphenol compounds that are naturally occurring in apples. Depending on the type of cider apple the producer is using, the tannin levels will be different. The more well-known ciders typically have lower tannin levels while traditional ciders have more. One example of a common tannin present in cider is Procyanidin B2.

The acids in cider play a vital role in both the cider making process and in the final flavour of a finished cider. They are present in both apples and cider, and add a sour taste and a pungent odor to these respective substances. Acids also serve as a preservative in the cider since microbes grow less in lower pH environments and contribute to the fermentation process. Most ciders have a pH of between 3.3 and 4.1. The primary acid found in apples is malic acid which accounts for around 90% of the acid content in apples. Malic acid contributes to the tart and sour flavours found in cider, and typically between 4.5 and 7.5 grams of malic acid per litre of cider is preferred. Malic acid is also used to determine apple ripeness for harvesting, as its concentration decreases as the fruit ripens. Lactic acid is also commonly found in cider, and it is mainly formed from malo-lactic fermentation, a process that converts malic acid into lactic acid. This process rounds out the flavour of the cider while reducing a lot of the acidity and producing carbon dioxide as well. Other acids such as citric acid can be used to add taste after fermentation, but these acids are not typically found in high concentration in apples naturally.

Most of the natural sugar in apples are used up in the fermentation process and are converted into alcohol, and carbon dioxide. If the fermentation goes all the way, the cider will have no perceivable residual sugar and be dry. This means that the cider will not taste sweet, and might show more bitterness, or acidity. Ciders are made in many parts of Europe and in the United States and each country has different representations of cider with different flavour compounds. Keeving is a traditional method of fermentation with low amounts of nitrogen in French and English ciders that is intended to slow down the rate of fermentation in hopes of retaining high esters as well as retaining some residual sugar in the bottled cider to increase effervescence in the aging process. Ciders can be back sweetened, after fermentation is complete to add a sweet taste and balance out acids, tannins, and bitterness. Natural sugar can be used but this can restart fermentation in a bottle if not filtered correctly. Artificial sweeteners can be used which are non-fermentable but some of these create an aftertaste, such as saccharin or sucralose, yet some of these are known for adding off flavour compounds.

Apples to cider 
An important component in cider-making is the addition of sulphur dioxide to inhibit the growth of many spoilage bacteria or yeasts in the juice. This encourages the inoculated yeast to dominate the juice environment, converting sugars to alcohol. Once sulfur dioxide dissolves in the juice, it converts into a pH dependent mixture of bisulfite, sulfite ions, and molecular sulfur dioxide. The "unbound" sulfur dioxide provides the antimicrobial environment in the juice, while the bisulfite and sulfite ions contribute to flavour. The quantity of sulfur dioxide needed to inhibit microbial activity is directly related to the pH of the juice; lower pH means less should be added, while higher pH juice requires more. Many cider producers add sulfur dioxide immediately after pressing and juicing, but before fermentation. However, in some cases it can be added afterwards to act as an antioxidant or stabiliser. This prevents the finished cider from releasing hydrogen peroxide or aldehydes that produce "off" odors and flavours.

Nitrogen is also a very important nutrient supporting yeast growth and fermentation in cider. Yeast require different forms of nitrogen to take up and use themselves so nitrogenous compounds are often added to apple juice. The mixture of nitrogen-containing compounds that yeast can use are referred to as 'Yeast Assimilable Nitrogen', or YAN. Even though YAN can be added into juice before fermentation, there are other ways to affect the levels of nitrogen in the juice before pressing, like the maturity of the orchard or what type of fertiliser is used. Using a fertiliser with a good amount of nitrogen will help the roots of apple trees; nitrogen fixing bacteria on the roots will be able to provide the tree with more nitrogen that will be able to make its way into the fruit. A low crop load can also yield juices with more YAN than a high crop load because the nitrogen in more concentrated in the low number of apples instead of being distributed to many apples. While a sufficient amount of YAN is good for the yeast and ensures fermentation of the sugars in the juice to alcohol, some cider makers may choose to limit nitrogen because it is the limiting factor. When the yeast are starved for nitrogen, they stop fermenting and die off. This can be desirable if cider makers prefer their cider to have some more sugar than alcohol in their cider. However, limiting YAN should be done in moderation because too little nitrogen can lead to an increase in hydrogen sulfide (H2S) production which is responsible for a rotten egg-like smell.

Primary cider fermentation can be initiated by inoculating the cider must with selected yeast strains or by permitting indigenous yeast strains present on the fruit and in the cider production equipment to spontaneously commence fermentation without inoculation. Inoculation with different strains of Saccharomyces cerevisiae and other yeast strains with strong fermentative metabolism traits, including Saccharomyces bayanus and Torulaspora delbrueckii strains, has been shown to produce few differences in cider phenolic compounds, save for concentrations of phloretin (see Phloretin) in samples that underwent malolactic fermentation. Spontaneous fermentation commenced by indigenous yeasts and finished by Saccharomyces cerevisiae can produce ciders with similar concentrations of important non-volatile acids, including lactic acid, succinic acid and acetic acid, while concentrations of volatile compounds such as methanol and 1-butanol, were present in different concentrations, dependent on apple cultivar. Extending the time during which the cider remains in contact with yeast lees increased concentrations of most of the minor volatile compounds present, especially fatty acids, ethyl esters and alcohols. Major volatile compound concentrations did not exhibit a similar pattern, with iso-butanol, amyl alcohols, and acetone decreasing 1-propanol decreasing.

Sparkling ciders can be produced using different methods, including the Champenoise method used to produce champagne. Use of different strains of indigenous Saccharomyces to perform secondary fermentation produced ciders with consistent alcohol and acidic characteristics, variable glycerol, acetaldehyde, ethyl acetate, methanol, propanol, i-butanol and 2-phenylethanol characteristics and acceptable sensory analysis results.

Yeast 
The selection of yeast used for cider production is critical to the quality of the final product. As with other fermented beverages, like wine and beer, the strain of yeast used to carry out the alcoholic fermentation also converts precursor molecules into the odorants found in the final product. In general, two broad categories of yeast are used for cider making: commercially developed strains and wild, or autochthonous, strains. In either case, the species tend to be either Saccharomyces cerevisiae or Saccharomyces bayanus. Commercial strains are available for purchase from numerous distributors, and their characteristics are typically outlined in manuals from the companies. Selection for fermentation may be based on a yeast's ability to ferment at particular sugar concentrations, temperatures, or pH. Some producers may also select for yeasts that produce killer factors, allowing them to out-compete other yeast in the juice, or they may select yeast that contribute mouthfeel or specific aromas to the cider.

"Wild fermentations" occur when autochthonous yeast are allowed to carry out fermentation; indigenous yeasts can spontaneously initiate fermentation without any addition of other yeast strains by the cider maker. Autochthonous yeasts are wild yeast strains that are endemic to the specific location in which a cider is produced; this is the traditional method used for cider making, and many producers feel that the strains unique to their cidery contribute a sense of terroir to their product. Wild yeast populations can be incredibly diverse and commonly include species of Saccharomyces, Candida, Pichia, Hanseniaspora and Metschnikowia. Typically, the native yeast take up residence in the cidery, and can be important to the unique flavour of the product. Although it was once believed that the native yeast carrying out these spontaneous fermentations also came from the orchard itself, research has shown that the microbes cultured from apples in the orchard do not align with the microbes found during the various stages of fermentation, suggesting that the sole source of native yeast is the cidery. Indigenous yeast strain population dynamics are affected by climatic conditions, apple variety, geographic location, and cider making technologies used. These variables cause different regions to host unique endemic yeast populations. The particular composition of endemic yeast strains and the yeast's activity during fermentation are responsible for the unique characteristics of ciders produced in certain regions. Unique autochthonous yeast populations promote different compositions of volatile flavour compounds, which form distinct tastes, aromas, and mouthfeel in finished ciders. Using wild yeast populations for fermentation introduces variability to the cider making process that makes it more difficult to generate multiple batches of cider that retain consistent characteristics.

Aside from carrying out the primary fermentation of cider, yeast may also play other roles in cider production. The production of sparkling cider requires a second round of fermentation, and a second yeast selection. The yeast used for the secondary fermentation in sparkling cider production serve the same purpose as the yeast used in the champagne method of sparkling wine production: to generate carbonation and distinct aromas with a fermentation that occurs in the bottle. The yeast is selected based on critical properties, such as tolerance to high pressure, low temperature, and high ethanol concentration, as well as an ability to flocculate, which allows for riddling to remove the yeast when the fermentation has finished. Some researchers have also suggested that non-Saccharomyces yeasts could be used to release additional flavour or mouthfeel compounds, as they may contain enzymes, such as β-glucosidase, β-xylosidase, or polygalacturonase, which Saccharomyces yeast may not produce.

Not all yeast associated with cider production are necessary for fermentation; many are considered spoilage microbes and can be a significant source of off odors in the finished product. Brettanomyces species produce volatile phenols, especially 4-ethyl phenol, which impart a distinct aroma called "Bretty", typically described as "barnyard", "horsey", or "bandaid". While these aromas would be considered spoilage odors in wines, many cider producers and consumers do not consider them a fault. Yeast species like Hanseniaspora uvarum, Metschnikowia pulcherrima, Saccharomyces uvarum, 
Zygosaccharomyces cidri, Candida pomicole, and Pichia membranifaciens have also been found to produce enzymes linked to generation of spoilage odors.

Festivals 

The western British tradition of wassailing the apple trees and making an offering of cider and bread in Autumn to protect the fertility of the orchard appears to be a relatively ancient tradition, superficially dating back to the pre-Christian Early Medieval period. The autumn tradition of 'bobbing' for apples is due to the abundance of fruit at this time.

A modern cider festival is an organised event that promotes cider and (usually) perry. A variety of ciders and perries will be available for tasting and buying. Such festivals may be organised by pubs, cider producers, or cider-promoting private organisations.

Uses and variations 

Calvados and applejack are distilled from cider.

Calvados is made throughout Normandy, France, not just in the Calvados département. It is made from cider by double distillation. In the first pass, the result is a liquid containing 28–30% alcohol. After the second pass, the concentration of alcohol is about 40%.

Applejack is a strong alcoholic beverage made in North America by concentrating cider, either by the traditional method of freeze distillation or by true evaporative distillation. In traditional freeze distillation, a barrel of cider is left outside during the winter. When the temperature is low enough, the water in the cider starts to freeze. If the ice is removed, the (now more concentrated) alcoholic solution is left behind in the barrel. If the process is repeated often enough, and the temperature is low enough, the alcohol concentration is raised to 20–30% alcohol by volume. Home production of applejack is popular in Europe.

Ice cider (French: cidre de glace), originating in Quebec and inspired by ice wine, has become a Canadian speciality, now also being produced in England. For this product, the apples are frozen either before or after being harvested. Its alcohol concentration is 9–13 % ABV. Cidre de glace is considered a local speciality in Quebec and can fetch high prices on the international market. In Canada, ice cider is produced by natural, outdoor freezing. In Europe and the United States, a similar product may be achieved through artificial, interior freezing, though often not under the name 'ice cider.'

Pommeau, a popular apéritif in Normandy, is a drink produced by blending unfermented apple juice and apple brandy in the barrel (the high alcoholic content of the spirit prevents fermentation of the juice and the blend takes on the character of the aged barrel).

Cocktails may include cider. Besides kir and snakebite, an example is Black Velvet in a version of which cider may replace champagne.

Cider may also be used to make vinegar. Apple cider vinegar is noted for its high acidity and flavour.

Related drinks 

Other fruits can be used to make cider-like drinks. The most popular is made from fermented pear juice, known as perry. It is called poiré in France and produced mostly in Lower Normandy there. A branded sweet perry known as Babycham, marketed principally as a women's drink and sold in miniature champagne-style bottles, was once popular in the UK but has become unfashionable. Another related drink is a form of mead, known as cyser. Cyser is a blend of honey and apple juice fermented together.

Although not widely made in modern times, various other pome fruits can produce palatable drinks. Apicius, in Book II of De re coquinaria, includes a recipe calling for quince cider.

National varieties

Europe 

Before the development of rapid long-distance transportation, regions of cider consumption generally coincided with those of cider production. As such, cider was said to be more common than wine in 12th-century Galicia and certainly the idea of it was present in England by the Conquest of 1066, using crab apples: the word "Wassail" is derived from a Saxon phrase, "wæs hæil": it is what would have been said by Saxons as a toast at Yuletide. Southern Italy, by contrast, though indeed possessing apples, had no tradition for cider apples at all and like its other neighbours on the Mediterranean Sea preserved the Roman tradition of apples as an ingredient for desserts, as evidenced by the frescoes at Herculaneum and Pompeii, descriptions by Classical writers and playwrights, and Apicius, whose famous cookbook does not contain a single recipe for fermenting apples but rather includes them as part of main courses, especially accompanying pork.

Austria 

In Austria, cider is made in the southwest of Lower Austria, the so-called "Mostviertel" and in Upper Austria as well as in parts of Styria. Almost every farmer there has some apple or pear trees. Many farmers also have a kind of inn called a "Mostheuriger", similar to a heuriger for new wine, where they serve cider and traditional fare. Non-sparkling cider is typically called "Most". Austria's most popular sparkling cider Goldkehlchen is produced in south Styria and marketed internationally since 2013 by the company founders Adam and Eva.

Belgium 

Cidrerie Ruwet SA, established in 1898, is the only independent craft cider producer in Belgium. In addition to their own brand Ruwet, the company produces 'high-end' ciders for private labels.

Heineken owns the other Belgian cider maker Stassen SA, who in addition to their own local brands such as Strassen X Cider also produce Strongbow Jacques, a 5.5% ABV cider with cherry, raspberry, and blackcurrant flavours. Zonhoven-based Konings NV specialises in private label ciders for European retailers and offers a wide variety of flavours and packaging options to the beverage industry. Stella Artois Cidre is produced in Zonhoven and has been marketed since 2011.

Denmark 

Despite a strong apple tradition, Denmark has little cider production. Six places that produce cider in Denmark are Pomona (since 2003), Fejø Cider (since 2003), Dancider (since 2004), Ørbæk Bryggeri (since 2006), Ciderprojektet (since 2008), and Svaneke Bryghus (since 2009). All are inspired mainly by English and French cider styles. The assortment of imported ciders has grown significantly since 2000, prior to that only ciders from Sweden, primarily non-alcoholic, were generally available. The leading cider on the Danish market is made by CULT A/S.
In 2008, Carlsberg launched an alcoholic cider in Denmark called Somersby cider which has an alcohol content of 4.7% and a sweet taste.

Finland 

The best-known brands labelled as cider are Golden Cap, Fizz, and Upcider. They typically contain 4.5–4.7% volume of alcohol. Virtually all Finnish "cider" is produced from fermented apple (or pear) juice concentrate mixed with water and is not cider as per the traditional description of the drink. Flavoured ciders, available in a large selection, are very popular and widely available in stores, with a variety of flavours ranging from forest berry to rhubarb and vanilla.

France 

France was one of the countries that inherited a knowledge of apple cultivation from both the Celtic Gauls and the later Romans, who ruled the country for approximately 500 years: both had knowledge of grafting and keeping apples. The earliest mentions of cider in this country go back to the Greek geographer Strabo: he speaks of the profusion of apple trees in Gaul and describes a cider-like drink.

In the 9th century, Charlemagne, in the Capitulars, ordered skilled brewers (the Sicetores) to always be present on his estates to make him ale, "pommé" (pomacium), perry and all the liquors liable to be used as drinks, and also ordered an expansion of planting apple trees in what is now Northern France.

French cidre is an alcoholic drink produced predominantly in Normandy and Brittany. It varies in strength from below 4% alcohol to considerably more. Cidre Doux is a sweet cider, usually up to 3% in strength. 'Demi-Sec' is 3–5% and Cidre Brut is a strong dry cider of 4.5% alcohol and above. Most French ciders are sparkling. Higher quality cider is sold in champagne-style bottles (cidre bouché). Many ciders are sold in corked bottles, but some screw-top bottles exist.
In crêperies (crêpe restaurants) in Brittany, cider is generally served in traditional ceramic bowls (or wide cups) rather than glasses. A kir Breton (or kir normand) is a cocktail apéritif made with cider and cassis, rather than white wine and cassis for the traditional kir. The Domfrontais, in the Orne (Basse-Normandie), is famous for its pear cider (poiré). The calvados du Domfrontais is made of cider and poiré.

Some cider is also made in southwestern France, in the French part of the Basque Country. It is a traditional drink there and is making a recovery. Ciders produced here are generally of the style seen in the Spanish part of the Basque Country. A recently popular variety is the Akived, a piquant drink served cold.

Calvados, from Normandy, and Lambig from Brittany are a spirits made of cider through a process called double distillation. In the first pass, the result is a liquid containing 28%–30% alcohol. In a second pass, the amount of alcohol is augmented to about 40%.

Germany 
German cider, usually called Apfelwein (apple wine), and regionally known as Ebbelwoi, Apfelmost (apple must), Viez (from Latin vice, the second or substitute wine), or Saurer Most (sour must), has an alcohol content of 5.5–7% and a tart, sour taste.

German cider is mainly produced and consumed in Hessen, particularly in the Frankfurt, Wetterau, and Odenwald areas, in Moselfranken, Merzig (Saarland) and the Trier area, as well as the lower Saar area and the region bordering on Luxembourg and in the area along the Neckar River in Swabia. In these regions, several large producers, as well as numerous small, private producers, often use traditional recipes. An official Viez route or cider route connects Saarburg with the border to Luxembourg.

Ireland 

Cider is a popular drink in Ireland. A single cider, Bulmers, dominates sales in Ireland: owned by C&C and produced in Clonmel, County Tipperary, Bulmers has a connected history to the British Bulmers cider brand up until 1949. Outside the Republic of Ireland, C&C brand their cider as Magners. It is very popular in Ireland to drink cider over ice and encouraged in their advertising. Cidona, a non-alcoholic version of Bulmers, is a popular soft drink in Ireland and used to be a C&C-owned brand. However, in recent years, other ciders have begun to take a large share in the market, for example, Heineken's 'Orchard Thieves'.

There has been a renaissance in the smaller artisanal cider producers since 2010. These now number more than a dozen across the island of Ireland and offer the consumer a broad range of differing, typically non-mainstream flavour profiles.

Italy 

Cider was once widely produced in northern Italy's apple growing regions, with a marked decline during fascist rule, due to the introduction of a law banning the industrial production of alcoholic beverages derived from fruits of less than 7% ABV, which was aimed at protecting wine producers.
Present laws and regulations are favourable to cider makers, but production has only survived in a few alpine locations, mostly in the regions of Trentino, and in Piedmont, where it is known as vin ëd pom (apple wine) or pomada, because it traditionally was left to ferment in a vat along with grape pomace, giving it a distinctive reddish colour.

Netherlands
In the Netherlands, cider is not as commonly available as in its surrounding countries. In 2007, Heineken started testing a cider-based drink branded Jillz in a number of bars throughout the country. The beverage, an alcopop made by blending sparkling water, fruit flavouring, malt, and cider, is marketed towards female drinkers as an alternative to beer. At the same time, Heineken also introduced Strongbow Gold as a secondary brand to provide the choice of a real cider, which was targeted to a male audience. Both beverages contain 5% alcohol by volume, which is similar to a typical draught beer in the Netherlands. Other brands are available in supermarkets, most noticeably Magners and Savanna Dry, and in liquor stores, generally, a broader range may be obtained.

Norway
In Norway, cider (sider) is a naturally fermented apple juice. Pear juice is sometimes mixed with the apple to get a better fermenting process started.

Three brands of sparkling cider with an ABV of approximately 10% are available to the Norwegian public through distribution by the monopoly outlet Vinmonopolet, Hardanger Sider Sprudlande from Hardanger, Krunesider from Bergen sourcing apples from Hardanger, and Liersider from Lier. In line with the law of 1975 prohibiting all advertising of alcoholic beverages of ABV above 2.5%, the products receive little exposure despite a few favourable press reviews.

Ciders of low alcohol levels are widely available, mostly brands imported from Sweden; carbonated soft drinks with no alcoholic content may also be marketed as "cider".

Portugal
Cider was once very popular in northern Portugal where its production was larger than wine production until the 11th century, but nowadays, its popularity has decreased and it is mostly consumed in the coasts of Minho, Âncora e Lima, where it is used as a refreshment for thirst. In some festivities, it is still used rather than wine. There is also a traditional production of the drink in Madeira.

Poland

Poland is the largest producer of apples in Europe. Cider is known in Poland as Cydr or Jabłecznik. In 2013, Poles drank 2 million litres of cider, which adds up to 1% of the country's annual alcohol sales. Sales more than doubled from the previous year. In the summer of 2014, Minister of Economy Janusz Piechociński supported in vain the creation of a draft law to legalise television cider publicity.

The category is just gaining popularity among consumers. Areas strong in cider production are focused around the centre of the country in the Masovian and Łódź voivodeships.
Large quantities of Polish apple concentrate are exported to UK, Scandinavia, and Ireland for cider production.

Spain

The making and drinking of cider is traditional in several areas of northern Spain, mainly Galicia, the Principality of Asturias, Cantabria, and the Basque Country.

The largest producer of cider in Spain is the Atlantic region of Asturias, where cider is considered not only a beverage but an intrinsic part of its culture and folklore. Asturias amounts more than 80% of the whole production of Spain. The consumption of cider in Asturias is of 54 litres per person/year, probably the highest in any European region.
One of the most popular ciders in Spain is called "El Gaitero" (the bagpipe player) which can be found everywhere in Spain and which is produced in this region. However, it must not be confused with the traditional Asturian cider as it is a sparkling cider more in the way of French ciders. It is a factory produced cider, sweet and very foamy, much like lambrusco, different from the more artisan and traditional cider productions. Recently, new apple tree plantations have been started in grounds belonging to the old coal mines, once important in Asturias.

The first testimony about cider in Asturias was made by Greek geographer Strabo in 60 BC.

The traditional Asturian sidra is a still cider of 4–8% strength, although there are other varieties. Traditionally, it is served in sidrerías and chigres, pubs specialising in cider where it is also possible to have other drinks as well as traditional food. One of the most outstanding characteristics is that it is poured in very small quantities from a height into a wide glass, with the arm holding the bottle extended upwards and the one holding the glass extended downwards. This technique is called escanciar un culín (also echar un culín) and is done to get air bubbles into the drink (espalmar), thus giving it a sparkling taste like Champagne that lasts a very short time.
Cider is also poured from barrels in the traditional Espichas.

Cider has also been popular in the Basque Country for centuries. Whilst Txakoli and Rioja wines became more popular in Biscay, Álava, and Navarre during the 19th century, there is still a strong Basque cider culture in Gipuzkoa. From the 1980s, government and gastronomic associations have worked to revive this culture in all Basque regions. Known as sagardoa (IPA: /s̺a'gardoa/), it is drunk either bottled or in a cider house (called a sagardotegi), where it is poured from barrels. Most of "sagardotegis" are in the north of Gipuzkoa (Astigarraga, Hernani, Urnieta, and Usurbil), but they can be found everywhere in Gipuzkoa, the northwest of Navarre and the northern Basque country.

Cider tasting events are popular in the Basque province of Gipuzkoa, where stalls are set up on the street selling the drink from several producers at cheap prices and served until stock runs out.

Sweden

Due to Swedish law, stores in Sweden cannot sell cider with less than 15 percentage juice by volume under the name Cider. "Cider" with none or less than 15% juice is instead usually sold as "Apple/Pear beverage of cider character" (Swedish: "Äpple-/Pärondryck med Ciderkaraktär"). Brands of cider in Sweden include Rekorderlig, Kivik, Herrljunga and Kopparberg.

Switzerland
In Switzerland cider is called Suure Most or Saft in the German-speaking part, Cidre in the Romandy, and sidro in the Italian-speaking regions. The drink was made popular in the 19th century when apple production increased due to progress in pomology. At the turn of the century, cider consumption was at 28.1 litres per person. In the 1920s, advantages in the pasteurisation of apple juice and the emerging temperance movement led to a strong decrease of cider production.

Today, typical Swiss cider consists of fermented apple juice mixed with 30% fresh juice which is added for sweetness. This drink is then pasteurised and force-carbonated. Imported cider is not common as according to Swiss laws cider must contain more than 70% of juice.

United Kingdom

There are two broad main traditions in cider production in the UK: the West Country tradition and the eastern Kent and East Anglia tradition. The former are made using a much higher percentage of true cider apples and so are richer in tannins and sharper in flavour. Kent and East Anglia ciders tend to use a higher percentage of or are exclusively made from, culinary and dessert fruit; they tend to be clearer, more vinous and lighter in body and flavour.

At one end of the scale are the traditional, small farm-produced varieties. These are non-carbonated and usually cloudy orange in appearance. Britain's West Country contains many of these farms which have an abundance of ancient varieties of specialist cider-apples. Production is often on such a small scale, the product being sold only at the site of manufacture or in local pubs and shops. At the other end of the scale are the factories mass-producing brands such as Strongbow and Blackthorn.

Mass-produced cider, such as that produced by Bulmers, is likely to be pasteurised and force-carbonated. The colour is likely to be golden yellow with a clear appearance from the filtration. White ciders are almost colourless in appearance and only need contain 25% apple.

Americas 
In the US, "cider" often refers to sweetened, unfiltered apple juice, traditionally made with a distinct sweet-tart taste, and in these regions, the fermented (alcoholic) beverage is known as "hard cider". In Canada, "cider" usually refers to the alcoholic drink, while the non-alcoholic juice may sometimes be called "apple cider".

Argentina
In Argentina, cider, or sidra is by far the most popular alcoholic carbonated drink during the Christmas and New Year holidays. It has traditionally been considered the choice of the middle and lower classes (along with ananá fizz and pineapple juice), whereas the higher classes would rather go for champagne or local sparkling wines for their Christmas or New Year toast. Popular commercial brands of cider are Real, La Victoria, "Rama Caida", Tunuyan. It was traditionally marketed in 0.72-litre glass bottles, similar to Champagne bottles, and PET bottles for the lower-end brands.

However, cider had a strong growth and is becoming a year-round beverage. Most brands now offer half-litre cans, and new flavors such as berries, peer, and some flavored with plants such as elderberry and cardamom.

Brazil
Just like the Argentinian marked, cider, or sidra is a very popular alcoholic beverage during the festive seasons of Christmas and New Year's in Brazil. Just like in that country, it has also been the traditional choice of the middle and lower classes for traditional sparkling for said season. Cereser, one of the most traditional cider brands in Brazil, claims on its website that "in tune with the Brazilian market" it has diversified its product range along the years from the traditional apple flavour, to other more uncommon ones elsewhere in the world, with fruity flavours ranging from peach to grapes, and including even alcohol-free ciders on its product range.

Canada 
Cider is produced commercially in every Canadian province except Manitoba, Newfoundland and Labrador and Saskatchewan, usually with a 5–7% alcohol content although the term is also used for some non-fermented apple juices. According to the Canadian Food and Drug Regulations, alcoholic cider is an alcoholic fermentation of apple juice that does not contain more than 13% absolute alcohol by volume (ABV) or less than 2.5% ABV. 

Quebec cider is considered a traditional alcoholic beverage. It is generally sold in 750 ml bottles, has an alcohol content generally between 7% and 13% (with aperitifs ciders having alcohol content up to 20%), and can be served as a substitute for wine. As in the rest of the world, sparkling cider is getting more and more popular in Quebec and thanks to the law cider sold in the province can only be made from 100% pure apple juice. Cider making was, however, forbidden from the early years of British rule as it was in direct conflict with established British brewers' interests (most notably John Molson). In recent years, a new type called ice cider has been sold. This type of cider is made from apples with a particularly high level of sugar caused by natural frost.

The regulations regarding cider in Canada are fairly strict in terms of sourcing and alcohol content. For it to be legally sold as cider, it must be the product of the alcoholic fermentation of apple juice and it must contain no less than 2.5 and no more than 13.0 percent alcohol by volume. However, the list of ingredients that may be added during manufacture is quite flexible and allows for 17 different categories of foods, chemicals and gases.

Chile
Cider has been made in Chile since colonial times. Southern Chile accounts for nearly all cider production in the country. Chileans make a distinction between "sidra" ("cider"), in fact, sparkling cider, and "chicha de manzana" ("apple chicha"), a homemade cider that is considered of less quality.

Mexico
Two types of cider (sidra) are sold in Mexico. One type is a popular apple-flavoured, carbonated soft drink, sold under a number of soft drink brands, such as Sidral Mundet and Manzana Lift (both Coca-Cola FEMSA brands), Manzanita Sol (owned by PepsiCo), and Sidral Aga from Group AGA. The other type, alcoholic sidra, is a sparkling cider typically sold in Champagne-style bottles with an alcohol content comparable to beer. Sidra was, due to the expense of imported champagne, sometimes used as a substitute for New Year's Eve toasts in Mexico, as it is also a sweet, fruity drink. However, now the practice is to drink cider on Christmas Eve, celebrated with the family, and champagne on New Year's celebrated with friends. Cider beverages form a very small share of the Mexican alcoholic beverage market, with the figures for 2009 volume sales amounting to only 3.8 million litres.

United States

In the United States, the definition of "cider" is usually broader than in Europe and specifically Ireland and the UK. There are two types, one as traditional alcoholic hard cider and the other sweet or soft cider, often simply called apple cider. In the 2010s, hard cider experienced a resurgence in consumption in the United States. This has largely reversed in recent years, in part due to the rise of hard seltzer.

Uruguay
Cider fizz or fizz is a cider variety made by mixing and fermenting various fruit juices other than apple with cider, as ananá fizz (pineapple juice), frutilla fizz (strawberry juice) or durazno fizz (peach juice).

East Asia
Usually, "cider" in East Asia refers to a soft drink similar to Sprite or lemonade.

China
A popular drink in China is called "Apple cider vinegar". Shanxi Province is noted for the "vinegar" produced there.

Japan
In Japan, the terms  or "apple sparkling wine" usually refer to the alcoholic beverage to distinguish it from the sparkling unalcoholic soda drink, cider, although both terms are now interchangeably used. While Japan is not historically a cider-making country, there is currently a renaissance of new, younger cider makers in the prefectures of Aomori and Nagano, such as Aomori's A-Factory.

In 2019, the number of international ciders imported to Japan increased, signifying a start to its popularity among Japanese consumers.

South Asia

India 
Recent economic growth has led to development of new categories of alcohol in India. Cider is one such category. New product launches are seen in almost all metropolitan cities. The nuanced taste and rich legacy of cider from the British era helps the prospects of the drink in the bored scenario of pale lagers.

Also a filtered non-alcoholic carbonated apple juice called "Appy Fizz" was introduced by Parle in India in 2005 and it became an instant hit. Recently, they have decided to push the brand beyond the ₹1,000 crore mark ($97.5 million).

Pakistan
Non-alcoholic, apple-flavoured carbonated drinks are popular in the country, with local brands such as Mehran Bottler's Apple Sidra and Murree Brewery's Big Apple in the market.

Africa

Kenya
East African Breweries launched Tusker Premium Cider in 2017.

South Africa
There are two main brands of cider produced in South Africa, Hunters and Savanna Dry. They are produced and distributed through Distell Group Limited. Hunters Gold was first introduced in South Africa in 1988 as an alternative to beer. The Hunters range includes Hunters Dry, Hunters Gold, Hunters Export and Hunters Edge launched in April 2017. Savanna Dry was introduced in 1996 and also comes in a Light Premium variety as well as in a Savanna Dark variant.

Oceania

Australia
In the Australia New Zealand the Food Standards Code defines cider as "fruit wine prepared from the juice or must of apples and no more than 25% of the juice or must of pears".
Cider has been made in Australia since its early settlement. Primarily this production has been for limited local usage, with national commercial distribution and sales dominated by three brands: Mercury Cider, Strongbow and Willie Smith's. Since early 2005, they have been joined in the market by numerous new producers including Three Oaks Cider, Pipsqueak, and Tooheys 5 Seeds Cider as well as imported brands like Magners, Weston's, Monteith's, Kopparberg, Rekorderlig, and Somersby.

With the growth in interest in cider, the number of local producers has increased. Some cider producers are attempting to use more traditional methods and traditional cider apple varieties such as Henry's of Harcourt and Crucible in S.W. Victoria. Other smaller brands rely on the available culinary (standard eating—supermarket and cooking apples) fruit. In the Yarra Valley early producers were Kelly Brothers cider and Lilydale. Later came Napoleone & Co. The Bridge Road Brewery and Amulet Winery, both in Victoria's Beechworth, have released ciders. South Australia's boutique ciders include Lobo (Adelaide Hills), The Hills Cider (Adelaide Hills), Thorogoods (Burra), and Aussie Cider (Barossa). In Western Australia, the number of cider producers has also grown in the southwest region, particularly in areas where wine is also produced with producers in Denmark, Pemberton, and Margaret River. In Tasmania, there are a number of boutique cider makers including Red Sails (Middleton), Pagan Cider (Huon Valley), Dickens Cider (Tamar Valley), and Spreyton Cider (Spreyton). Willie Smith's is a medium to large producer of commercial and craft cider.

New Zealand
In New Zealand, cider is categorised as a fruit wine and the rules which define what can be called a cider are very lax—the standards do not even specify a minimum for the amount of apple juice required to call a drink "cider". At the same time Ready to Drink beverages are not permitted for sale in supermarkets and grocery outlets. These two factors have resulted in the production of a wide range of low juice content, sweet, often flavoured drinks under the "cider" banner being used to circumvent this restriction. Most of these ciders are produced and marketed by the three large brewers (Lion Nathan, DB and Independent).

Most New Zealand ciders are made from concentrate or from reject apples from the country's significant export apple industry. These ciders are made year round with little consideration given to maturation.

A few producers have demonstrated that NZ's excellence in apple production can translate into the manufacture of world class ciders. Peckham's Cider is the principal producer in this class. They make whole juice ciders from apples grown specifically for cidermaking, principally from their own orchard of 30 heritage cider varieties. They have won Champion Cider in the NZ Cider Awards in 2015, 2016 and 2017.

Abel Cider of Nelson is another producer to make vintage cider from 100% freshly harvested apples and pears. Unlike the bulk producers, Abel hand harvest tree ripened fruit, crush it, then ferment until dry. Abel is unfined and unfiltered, meaning they allow the cider to naturally clarify via gravity; this gentle process helps preserve the natural fruit characteristics.

All mass-produced ciders in New Zealand are loosely regulated with their minimum content of fruit juice and alcohol content (mostly 4 to 5%).

Lion produces Isaac's ciders from concentrate under the Mac's trademark. The range includes three artificial flavours: apple, pear, and berry with limited edition ciders that are released seasonally. Their Speight's brand also makes a cider from concentrate.

The Dominion Breweries brands Monteith's Brewery in Greymouth on the west coast of the South Island makes an apple and a pear cider while their Old Mout Cider—based in Nelson in the South Island—is blending fruit wines with cider to create fruit ciders including boysenberry and feijoa varieties. Rekorderlig Cider (Pear, Wild Berries, Mango and Raspberry, Strawberry and Lime, Apple and Blackcurrant and Apple and spice), and Johnny Arrow Cider are another two brands owned by this company.

See also

 Fassbrause
 Hard soda
 List of cider brands
 List of cideries in the United States
 List of beverages

References

Further reading
 Farmhouse Cider & Scrumpy, Bob Bunker 1999
 Household Cyclopedia, 1881
 The History and Virtues of Cyder, R. K. French (Robert Hale 1982 - reprinted 2010)

External links

 
Apple drinks
Christmas food
Fermented drinks
World cuisine
Alcoholic drinks